Disco Bill (1977) is an album by Bill Cosby. It is his fifth, and last, musical comedy/parody album. As with Bill Cosby Is Not Himself These Days, Cosby stated he improvised much of the material on the album; as its name implies, the album spoofs the disco craze of the late 1970s.

Track listing
A Simple Love Affair (Cosby, Gardner) – 4:38
What Ya Think 'Bout Lickin' My Chicken (Cosby, Gardner, Watson) – 4:04
Rudy (Cosby, Gardner) – 1:56
Boogie on Your Face (Cosby, Gardner) – 3:03
Happy Birthday Momma (Cosby, Gardner, Mays) – 4:01
That's How I Met Your Mother (Cosby, Gardner) – 3:19
1, 2, 3 (Barry) – 4:10
Section #9 (Cosby, Gardner) – 3:12
A Nasty Birthday (Cosby) – 3:32
What's in a Slang (Cosby, Gardner) – 2:19

References

1977 albums
Bill Cosby albums
Capitol Records albums
1970s comedy albums